La vida de Rita is a Spanish comedy television series. Written and directed by Manuel Iborra, it stars Verónica Forqué, Juan Echanove and Pepón Nieto. It aired on Televisión Española (La 1 and La 2) in 2003.

Premise 
Rita (Verónica Forqué), Samuel (Juan Echanove) and Cucho (Pepón Nieto) own a bar where the rest of the characters hang out.

Cast 
Main
 Verónica Forqué as Rita, a separated woman with two daughters, co-owner of a bar-restaurant-billiard club.
 Juan Echanove as Samuel, Rita's business associate, infatuated by Rita, a mediocre cook.
 Pepón Nieto as Cucho, Rita's business associate, Samuel's brother, unbearable and chronically aggressive.
 María Vázquez as Berta, Rita's biological daughter.
 Macarena Gómez as Leonor, Rita's adopted daughter.
 Agustín González as Fernando, Samuel and Cucho's father. 
 Sandra Blázquez as Rosarito, Cucho's daughter.
Guest
 Antonio Resines.
 Pilar Bardem.

Production and release 
Written and directed by Manuel Iborra, the series meant the return of Verónica Forqué to Televisión Española (TVE) after Pepa y Pepe, also directed by Iborra. The series was produced by Tesauro. It consisted of 13 episodes with a running time of roughly 70 minutes.

The series premiered on 7 January 2003 in prime time, earning good viewership figures (4,183,000 viewers and a 23.7% share). However, the interest of the viewers rapidly waned and TVE cancelled the series after the 5th episode, aired on 4 February 2003. 8 episodes were left unaired in the original run.

About two hundred of TVE Catalunya workers denounced the replacement of the series for a documentary about bioterrorism as an alleged part of government propaganda efforts in favour of the Iraq War, voicing their "rejection of the policy of intoxication and manipulation of information that RTVE is carrying out with regard to the Iraq conflict".

The full series aired in the northern hemisphere summer of 2003 on La 2. As of 2021, the series was not available in the RTVE's online catalogue.

References 

2003 Spanish television series debuts
2003 Spanish television series endings
La 1 (Spanish TV channel) network series
La 2 (Spanish TV channel) network series
2000s Spanish comedy television series
Spanish television sitcoms
Television series set in restaurants
Spanish-language television shows